Club Deportivo Santurtzi Kirol Elkartea is a football team based in Santurtzi in the autonomous community of Basque Country. Founded in 1952, it plays in Tercera División. Its stadium is San Jorge, with a capacity of 2,000 seats.

Season to season

4 seasons in Segunda División B
34 seasons in Tercera División

Famous players
 José Luis González
 Jorge Sánchez
 Unai Expósito

References

External links
CD Santurtzi Official website
División de Honor

Football clubs in the Basque Country (autonomous community)
Association football clubs established in 1952
Divisiones Regionales de Fútbol clubs
1952 establishments in Spain